The following is a partial list of the "C" codes for Medical Subject Headings (MeSH), as defined by the United States National Library of Medicine (NLM).

This list continues the information at List of MeSH codes (C21). Codes following these are found at List of MeSH codes (C23). For other MeSH codes, see List of MeSH codes.

The source for this content is the set of 2006 MeSH Trees from the NLM.

– animal diseases

– abortion, veterinary
  – brucellosis, bovine

– actinobacillosis

– aleutian mink disease

– anal gland neoplasms

– anaplasmosis

– bird diseases
  – avian leukosis
  – fowlpox
  – influenza in birds
  – malaria, avian
  – marek disease
  – newcastle disease
  – poultry diseases
  – enteritis, transmissible, of turkeys
  – influenza in birds
  – poult enteritis mortality syndrome
  – sarcoma, avian
  – tuberculosis, avian

– borna disease

– cat diseases
  – feline acquired immunodeficiency syndrome
  – feline infectious peritonitis
  – feline panleukopenia
  – leukemia, feline

– cattle diseases
  – bovine respiratory disease complex
  – pasteurellosis, pneumonic
  – pneumonia, atypical interstitial, of cattle
  – pneumonia of calves, enzootic
  – bovine virus diarrhea-mucosal disease
  – brucellosis, bovine
  – encephalopathy, bovine spongiform
  – enzootic bovine leukosis
  – ephemeral fever
  – freemartinism
  – hemorrhagic syndrome, bovine
  – infectious bovine rhinotracheitis
  – lumpy skin disease
  – malignant catarrh
  – mastitis, bovine
  – theileriasis
  – trypanosomiasis, bovine
  – tuberculosis, bovine
  – white heifer disease

– disease models, animal

– dog diseases
  – distemper
  – hepatitis, infectious canine
  – hip dysplasia, canine

– enterotoxemia

– erysipelothrix infections
  – swine erysipelas

– fish diseases
  – furunculosis
  – hemorrhagic septicemia, viral

– foot-and-mouth disease

– foot rot

– goat diseases

– heartwater disease

– hepatitis, animal
  – hepatitis, viral, animal
  – hepatitis, infectious canine
  – rift valley fever

– horse diseases
  – african horse sickness
  – equine infectious anemia
  – glanders
  – strongyle infections, equine

– keratoconjunctivitis, infectious

– lameness, animal

– mammary neoplasms, animal

– muscular dystrophy, animal
  – white muscle disease

– myxomatosis, infectious

– parasitic diseases, animal
  – helminthiasis, animal
  – dictyocaulus infections
  – dirofilariasis
  – fascioloidiasis
  – monieziasis
  – setariasis
  – strongyle infections, equine
  – toxocariasis
  – protozoan infections, animal
  – babesiosis
  – cryptosporidiosis
  – dourine
  – theileriasis
  – toxoplasmosis, animal
  – trypanosomiasis, bovine

– paratuberculosis

– parturient paresis

– peste-des-petits-ruminants

– pleuropneumonia, contagious

– primate diseases
  – ape diseases
  – monkey diseases
  – marburg virus disease
  – simian acquired immunodeficiency syndrome
  – monkeypox

– pseudorabies

– rinderpest

– rodent diseases
  – ectromelia, infectious
  – monkeypox
  – murine acquired immunodeficiency syndrome

– salmonella infections, animal

– sheep diseases
  – bluetongue
  – border disease
  – ecthyma, contagious
  – louping ill
  – nairobi sheep disease
  – pneumonia, progressive interstitial, of sheep
  – pulmonary adenomatosis, ovine
  – scrapie
  – swayback
  – visna

– steatitis

– swine diseases
  – african swine fever
  – classical swine fever
  – edema disease of swine
  – encephalomyelitis, enzootic porcine
  – epidermitis, exudative, of swine
  – gastroenteritis, transmissible, of swine
  – pneumonia of swine, mycoplasmal
  – porcine reproductive and respiratory syndrome
  – swine erysipelas
  – swine vesicular disease
  – vesicular exanthema of swine

– venereal tumors, veterinary

– wasting disease, chronic

– zoonoses

The list continues at List of MeSH codes (C23).

C22